Intermountain may refer to:

 Intermountain West, geographical region in the Western United States
 Intermountain states, states generally considered to be part of the Intermountain West
 Intermountain Aviation, also known as Intermountain Airlines and Intermountain Airways, a CIA airline company
 Intermountain Healthcare, a not-for-profit healthcare system and the largest healthcare provider in the Intermountain West.
 Intermountain Manufacturing Company, an aircraft manufacturing company in the U.S. in the 1960s
 Intermountain Power Agency, a power generating cooperative of 23 municipalities in Utah and 6 in California
 Intermountain Power Plant, a large coal-fired power plant at Delta, Utah, United States owed by the Intermountain Power Agency
 Path 27 or Intermountain Power Project DC Line, an HVDC power transmission line